Sleuth 101 was an Australian comedy "improvisatory whodunit game show" television series, broadcast on ABC1 in 2010. The series revolves around a murder-mystery that must be solved by a celebrity guest detective. Each episode features a guest detective (usually a comedian), four suspects, a crime scene, evidence and witness accounts - just like real detective work. The show is hosted by comedian Cal Wilson, who occasionally gives subtle hints towards the crime. Each week, the guest detective must solve the murder using his or her evidence. There are some similarities to the 1970s British series Whodunnit!, the 1990s Australian television game show Cluedo, and the 2010s British series Armchair Detectives. A second series was originally being negotiated by the ABC, but later cancelled.

History

Conception
Sleuth 101 was created by series producer Anthony Watt and executive producer Bruce Kane, who were the team behind Spicks and Specks, for Mayhem TV. Mumbrella reports that they "noticed the emergence of similar programs, featuring panels and people sitting down [and] realised there was a need for something a little more 'physical' and decided to go beyond a traditional game show by incorporating a scripted narrative portion to its structure, as well as an element of improvisation." On this point, Watt said "I was always a fan of mystery, so a whodunit kind of show suggested itself and we thought, how can we turn that into a game show?", and Kane added "The idea of using comedians was very attractive to us, to get people that we worked with on Spicks and Specks to solve the crime...Mystery tends to appeal to older audiences as well. In the same way that Spicks and Specks has never aimed at one demographic and grandparents watch it with their children, we’re looking for a similar kind of audience here".Watt felt it was essential for the producers to find the right tone for the show; his vision was "to modernise the whodunit concept by incorporating elements of forensic science, but keeping it as a family-oriented PG program", noting "the 10-minute drama element is definitely on a comedy tone" despite dealing with "serious subjects". This tone had to match the look of the series, and be maintained through both the dramatised and studio segments. John Olb was hired to direct both aspects to help ensure continuity. Watt said "It’s a whodunit show, but not as we know it.  We’ve thrown in twists, turns, clues, red herrings and the best comic talent this country has seen.  It’s ruthless, cold-blooded murder with jokes.  Solve the crime or just kick back and laugh. Or both". The show was described as "light entertainment" by Kane; "although shot in front of a live studio audience, it doesn’t feature audience participation and people can’t aspire to be contestants, a defining feature of the game genre. The incentive for audiences at home to watch, beyond the fantasy of participating in the show themselves, is the humour". Due to ABC's editorial policies, game shows are not allowed to give prizes away. Kane said that because of this restriction, "people have to play it just for the laugh, and there are only so many of those shows you can make". Cal Wilson auditioned for the job while hosting a youth magazine show called The Drum in New Zealand, her first audition after having a baby. In September 2009 it was announced ABC had commissioned 8 half-hour episodes of the unscripted show. The show was appealing due to being "far less expensive than scripted drama", and because subverted TV conventions and exploiting their potential for light entertainment.

Filming, writing, budget
The series began filming on 21 September 2009 in Melbourne, and featured both on-location and studio filming. The series took nine weeks to shoot, with the crew filming two sets of two-day location shoots each week, followed by studio days the next week. Each episode took an average of three days to shoot. Dale Mark's art department was in charge of the creation and recreation of the murder scenes. Dale Mark's art department was in charge of the creation (on location) and recreation (in the live studio) of the murder scenes; Watt noted "They’re all interiors, due to the limiting nature of a whodunit with only four suspects, and the fact that we have to match the location in the studio". The series' main writer is comedian Matt Parkinson, though Wilson was "given licence to tweak the script", commenting "I got hooked on alliteration in the summation part of the show, and that became part of that segment and then I just added little gags. It was great to feel such a part of the process." Watt and Brendan Luno wrote the scripted segments were written over 16 weeks. Each episode of the first series presented a self-contained story set in contemporary setting, including a MasterChef parody, a recording studio, a gym, and an office. To mUmbrella, Kane would not disclose the budget for Sleuth 101, but hoffered the following formula as a guide: "Half a drama shoot + half an episode of Spicks and Specks = the cost of Sleuth 101. 10 minutes worth of drama plus 20 minutes of light entertainment". Cal wrote some alliteration summaries for the shows. Cal noted there were some 10-year-old boys in the audience who reached the correct solution. Cal enjoyed seeing comedians try their hand at cerebral detective work. ARIA award designer Mark Denning gave the ABC permission to use the award as a weapon it the second episode of the show, though The Australian noted this has never happened in real life.

Dealing with improvisation
Kane endeavoured to prevent the show becoming a "series of gags: "The comedy has to be relevant to the plot and feel of the show. Some folk need assistance with that, and they often need to be briefed. That way, they’re working towards the whole show. And even if the guest comedian is not at all funny, we still have a good mystery show. That’s safe for us, because we know we always have something good in the background". Cal noted that it didn't matter if guest detectives were correct or not as it's "hilarious" either way. If they got stuck, she would give them leading clues such as "that piece of paper you picked up looks interesting"; in one instance "Frank Woodley was really quite hopeless at finding clues" so she resorted to using a hotter/colder system to guide him. Watt said "The value is that you get to see people improvising. When you put comedians under pressure, trying to solve a crime, they come up with fantastic jokes. That to us is fascinating". Commenting on the unique position of watching fellow comedians in an unfamiliar, pressured situation Cal said:

Run
ABC's Amanda Duthie said, "We’re delighted to have Cal Wilson host Sleuth 101. She’s funny, smart and surprising and will be the perfect guide for these weekly tales of crime".

The show follows in the tradition of murder mystery game shows, including Ian McFadyen's Cluedo aired in 1992 on Nine, UK's 1970s series Whodunnit?, and the 1950s game show To Tell the Truth. It is "tailored in the good-natured vein of Spicks and Specks, Collectors and The Einstein Factor". In an interview with Nova FM, Cal described the shows reminiscent of How to Host a Murder Party, "but not daggy".

In March 2010, the series moved to 6:30pm Sundays. On 15 March Head of programming Marena Manzoufas said: "The dedicated Collectors' audience has clearly demonstrated their preference for the show's original 8pm Friday slot so I have decided to reinstate it there and move Sleuth 101 to Sundays at 6.30pm".

Cal Wilson went to Chadstone ABC on 26 March to promote the Sleuth Season 1 DVD.

In early 2010, Kane told the magazine Encore that ABC saw the mystery/game show hybrid Sleuth 101 as a "highly 'formattable', sellable product", commenting "They’re very interested in this one; they seem to be keen to [sell the format]. We [Mayhem TV] control it in conjunction with the ABC, but they represent it". Though ABC had traditionally not used franchise-creating as a business strategy, Jane insisted "There’s no reluctance from them to do it, but it’s not something that they have done in a commercial sense. They seem to be keen to do it now, in recent times". Plans ultimately fell through.

A second season was originally planned, but it was cancelled due to low viewing figures of the show.

The series is available on iTunes as of 2019.

Format
After the guest detective is introduced, they watch prerecorded footage of the murder taking place and meeting the four suspects, and are then guided to a mock-up of the crime scene, where they scour for clues, which are then "sent to the lab" by Wilson. The detective then listens to the witness' accounts and then interrogates them. Wilson will jump in when she feels there is nothing more to tell, with some "lab results" from the clues the detective found. This will continue until all four suspects have been interrogated, when the detective then attempts to solve the crime. After successfully or unsuccessfully solving the crime, Wilson will point out the clues, and the show will end. The game has no script, and relies on just witness statements, footage flashback and forensic evidence.

Episodes
This is a list of episodes from the Australian Broadcasting Corporation's dark comedy miniseries, Sleuth 101, hosted by comedian Cal Wilson. The first series, consisting of eight episodes, ended on 11 April 2010.

Series 1

Critical reception
Upon the series' debut, The Sydney Morning Herald wrote that "Wilson exudes...good-natured charm and quick wit" and "even gets away with such daggy to-camera spiels". By the series' end, the newspaper concluded "What seemed both a promising idea and a rather delightful nod to two genre predecessors - the 1970s mystery show Whodunit? and the 1990s board game spin-off Cluedo - seems to stumble and fall in the execution. It is one thing to try to reinvent a genre after two fairly excellent executions but to live up to neither, with the benefit of significantly higher production values than both, is a terrible shame. Sleuth 101 is sold as a murder mystery but, in practice, it's a poor cousin to Thank God You're Here. It's jam-packed with familiar faces but the range of performances - from buffoonish to solid but unremarkable - lets it down". In a letter entitled "Case of the stolen timeslot", Ray Harrison wrote the following letter to The Age: "WHY all the whingeing about Sleuth 101? The description by Cindy Mann (Letters, 18/3) is correct. Collectors is OK but Sleuth 101 deserves far better than being buried on Sunday." The rarity of a woman heading the programme was remarked upon in New Zealand press, who put it down to her previous role in Thank God You're Here. The newspaper wrote "Host Cal Wilson is witty and charming but unless her celebrity guests come up with some snappy improvisation, the show falls flat." Sydney Morning Herald wrote the show "seems to stumble and fall in the execution". The Age deemed it a "new twist on a very, very old [series], though noted that the actors were "excellent" and were enjoying themselves. The newspaper felt the show managed to subvert some of the "ludicrous crime series conventions" such as the suspect interview and crime scene inspection. In another article it wrote that similar to the show's commercial cousin, Thank God You're Here, Sleuth 101 lives and dies by the strength of its celebrity guests. The paper also said the "promising" show "seems to stumble and fall in the execution".

Interactive game
On the Sleuth 101 website, an interactive murder mystery game tie-in was created, in which players have to solve 8 cases. The game is now inactive, though used to be located here. Each case had a different motive, and ranged from a retirement home, to a circus, to a church, to a book signing. Successfully solving the case gave the player clues for the upcoming episode of Sleuth 101. The site was finalist at the 2010 Atom Awards in the Best Multimedia category., It was also a finalist at the 17th AIMIA awards in the Best Entertainment category. The Australian deemed it a piece of "clever light entertainment".

DVD releases

References

External links
 On Metacritic
 
 
 
 

Australian Broadcasting Corporation original programming
2010 Australian television series debuts